Pat Davern is an Australian musician and the guitarist for Grinspoon. His solo album Alexander the Elephant in Zanzibar was nominated for the 2016 ARIA Award for Best Children's Album.

During a hiatus for Grinspoon Davern wrote a book "Alexander the Elephant in Zanzibar" which was illustrated by Martin Chatterton. The book was launched in November 2015. Davern also recorded an album version of the book. It featured appearances from Tom Williams, Pete Murray, Alex Lloyd, Megan Washington, Connie Mitchell and members of Kingswood.

Discography
Alexander the Elephant in Zanzibar (2015) - ABC Music/Universal Music

References

Living people
Australian musicians
Year of birth missing (living people)